Keystone (previously known as Keystone Station) is an unincorporated community in Bloomfield Township, Jackson County, Ohio, United States.

Keystone was founded as a company town for the Keystone Furnace, built between 1849 and 1853. At one time, the community had a population of 300-500 people. The post office was originally established as the Hughes Post Office on November 7, 1848. The name was changed to Keystone Post Office on October 1, 1849, and the branch was discontinued on July 16, 1853.

References 

Unincorporated communities in Jackson County, Ohio